Massachusetts question 3 may refer to:

Question 3, 2002 ballot
Question 3, 2006 ballot
Massachusetts Greyhound Protection Act, 2008 ballot
Massachusetts Sales Tax Relief Act, 2010 ballot
Massachusetts Medical Marijuana Initiative, 2012 ballot
Massachusetts Casino Repeal Initiative, 2014 ballot
Massachusetts Conditions for Farm Animals Initiative, 2016 ballot
Gender Identity Anti-Discrimination, 2018 ballot

Politics of Massachusetts